Zygaena osterodensis is a moth of the family Zygaenidae.

Subspecies
Z. o. osterodensis
Z. o. curvata Burgeff, 1926
Z. o. eupyrenaea Burgeff, 1926
Z. o. koricnensis Reiss, 1922
Z. o. mentzeri G. & H. Reiss, 1972
Z. o. osterodensis Reiss, 1921
Z. o. saccarella Balletto & Toso, 1978 
Z. o. schultei Dujardin, 1956
Z. o. trimacula Le Charles, 1957
Z. o. valida Burgeff, 1926
Z. o. validior (Burgeff, 1926)

Distribution
This species can be found in continental Europe, Russia included, except the south of the Iberian Peninsula and southern Italy, Greece and Great Britain, Denmark and northern Scandinavia. It reaches Asia Minor, the Caucasus and Lake Baikal.

Habitat

Description

The wingspan is about 35 mm. The color of body and forewings is black, with red patches almost always confluent into each other forming two parallel stripes. Moroeover in the apex of the forewings is pointed.

The caterpillars are about 20 millimeters long. They have a light gray-turquoise ground color, with large black spots.

This species is very similar to Zygaena romeo.

Biology
The caterpillars are found from August and after hibernation until May of the following year. They mainly feed on the leaves of Vicia cracca and Lathyrus vernus. Adults are on wing in June and July. They fly during the day.

Bibliography
Michael Chinery, Insectes de France et d'Europe occidentale, Paris, Flammarion, août 2012, 320 p., p. 134-135

References

External links
Moths and Butterflies of Europe and North Africa
 Lepiforum.de

Zygaena
Moths of Europe
Moths of Asia
Moths described in 1921